Sherston Software, also known as Sherston Publishing Group, was a British software publisher producing educational games and learning resources.

Two teachers, Bill and Lou Bonham, started making games for the BBC Micro in 1983 and established Sherston Software Limited in 1984. In 2003, Bill and Lou sold Sherston to a four-man management team, which led to the company being called Sherston Publishing Group. In 2008 the offices in Angel House, Sherston, Wiltshire also became home to BLi Education which owned the brands TAG Learning, Economatics Education and SEMERC. TAG Developments (based in Kennington, London) was also part of the group and produced MAPS – Managed Assessment and ePortfolio System – which featured some Sherston software content. In difficult trading conditions in the education market in 2010 and 2011, BLi Education went into administration but many of the assets were acquired by Sherston Publishing Group.

Sherston employed developers in India. An associate company, Sherston Sheshani operated out of an office in Cape Town, South Africa. Sherston also had an office in the United States (Sherston America) based in Portland, Oregon. Sherston Software also published software in association with partners including BBC Worldwide, HarperCollins and Oxford University Press.

In 2015, Sherston was acquired by private equity firm Big Clever Learning, and the original company was liquidated in 2016.

Software products

Planet Sherston
Rusty Dreamer
Tizzy's Toybox
Crystal: The ICT Channel
Gogglebox: Topic Based Online Channel
Sherston Mega Deal
Sherston Online
Sherston Skill Builders Online
The Crystal Rainforest
Mission Control
The ArcVenture series
The Map Detectives
The Nature Park Adventure
The Email Detectives
Izzy's Island
Number Train
abc-CD - Animated Alphabet
Skill Builders
School's Out - After School Club
123-CD
The Crystal Maze (based on the popular British TV game show The Crystal Maze)
Furbles
Space Mission Mada (later to be adapted into Australian TV show Space Mission Mada News)
Tina's Terrible Trumpet
The Worst Witch (based on the book The Worst Witch)
The Future Is Wild
The Fleet Street Phantom
Charlie Chimp's Big Modelling Party

References

External links
School's Out After School Club, archived in 2007
Profile at MobyGames

Defunct video game companies of the United Kingdom
Software companies of the United Kingdom
Educational software companies
Companies based in Wiltshire
British companies established in 1984
British companies disestablished in 2016